is a Japanese television drama that aired on NHK in 2007. It was the 76th Asadora.

Cast
 Manami Higa as Natsumi Asakura
 Ren Osugi as Keigo Asakura, Natsumi's father
 Masako Mori as Fusako Asakura, Natsumi's mother
 Asahi Uchida as Masaki Kagami, Natsumi's husband
 Mikihisa Azuma as Shinichi Kagami
 Akiko Hinagata as Emiko Kagami
 Ryunosuke Kamiki as Tomoya Asakura, Natsumi's younger brother
 Takeshō Aki as owner of the boarding house in Morioka
 Masayuki Suzuki as Kisunori Kagami
 Mitsuru Fukikoshi as Yujiro Imamoto
 Hiroyuki Nagato as Heiji
 Isao Sasaki as Masato Yoshizawa
 Mitsuko Kusabue as Katsuno Kagami, Masaki's grandmother
 Nobuko Miyamoto as Tamaki Kagami, Masaki's aunt

References

External links
  
 

2007 Japanese television series debuts
2007 Japanese television series endings
Asadora